József Petrikovics (born 5 October 1964) is a former international speedway rider from Hungary.

Speedway career 
Petrikovics was the champion of Hungary, winning the Hungarian Championship in 1992.

World final appearances

World Pairs Championship
 1993 -  Vojens, Speedway Center (with Antal Kocso / Zoltán Adorján) - 7th - 10pts

References 

1964 births
Living people
Hungarian speedway riders